Dulwich Common may refer to:

 A historic flood plain now called West Dulwich
 Part of the A205 South Circular road in Dulwich and the London Borough of Southwark.